Chioma Udeaja (born June 29, 1984) is a Nigerian basketball player for First Bank also known as the Elephant Girl and the Nigerian national team.

International career
She participated at the 2017 Women's Afrobasket.

References

1984 births
Living people
Nigerian women's basketball players
Sportspeople from Lagos
Power forwards (basketball)
Centers (basketball)
Nigerian expatriates in the Czech Republic